Esmail Kola-ye Kuchek (also Romanized as Esmā‘īl Kolā-ye Kūchek) is a village in Hasan Reza Rural District, in the Central District of Juybar County, Mazandaran Province, Iran. At the 2006 census, its population was 489, in 122 families.

References 

Populated places in Juybar County